National Aviation may refer to:

Civil aviation authority, also known as a national aviation authority, the government statutory authority in each country that oversees the approval and regulation of civil aviation
National Aviation Academy (NAA), an aviation maintenance training school located in Clearwater, Florida
National Aviation (Aviación Nacional), the air force established by the army in revolt in the Spanish Civil War  
National Aviation Hall of Fame, located at the National Museum of the United States Air Force 
National Aviation University, a university located in Kyiv, Ukraine 
National Aviation Day, a United States national observation 
National Aviation Company of India Limited (NACIL) 
National Aviation Facilities Experimental Center (NAFEC)
Australian National Aviation Museum, at the Moorabbin Airport in Melbourne
China National Aviation Corporation 
Rantoul National Aviation Center, a public airport located in Rantoul, Illinois